Wind tunnels are large tubes with air blowing through them which are used to replicate the interaction between air and an object flying through the air or moving along the ground. Researchers use wind tunnels to learn more about how an aircraft will fly. NASA uses wind tunnels to test scale models of aircraft and spacecraft. Some wind tunnels are large enough to contain full-size versions of vehicles. The wind tunnel moves air around an object, making it seem as if the object is flying.

Most of the time, large powerful fans suck air through the tube. The object being tested is held securely inside the tunnel so that it remains stationary. The object can be an aerodynamic test object such as a cylinder or an airfoil, an individual component, a small model of the vehicle, or a full-sized vehicle. The air moving around the stationary object shows what would happen if the object was moving through the air. The motion of the air can be studied in different ways; smoke or dye can be placed in the air and can be seen as it moves around the object. Coloured threads can also be attached to the object to show how the air moves around it. Special instruments can often be used to measure the force of the air exerted against the object.

The earliest wind tunnels were invented towards the end of the 19th century, in the early days of aeronautic research,
when many attempted to develop successful heavier-than-air flying machines. The wind tunnel was envisioned as a means of reversing the usual paradigm: instead of the air standing still and an object moving at speed through it, the same effect would be obtained if the object stood still and the air moved at speed past it. In that way a stationary observer could study the flying object in action, and could measure the aerodynamic forces being imposed on it.

The development of wind tunnels accompanied the development of the airplane. Large wind tunnels were built during World War II. Wind tunnel testing was considered of strategic importance during the Cold War development of supersonic aircraft and missiles.

Later, wind tunnel study came into its own: the effects of wind on man-made structures or objects needed to be studied when buildings became tall enough to present large surfaces to the wind, and the resulting forces had to be resisted by the building's internal structure. Determining such forces was required before building codes could specify the required strength of such buildings and such tests continue to be used for large or unusual buildings.

Circa the 1960s, wind tunnel testing was applied to automobiles, not so much to determine aerodynamic forces per se but more to determine ways to reduce the power required to move the vehicle on roadways at a given speed. In these studies, the interaction between the road and the vehicle plays a significant role, and this interaction must be taken into consideration when interpreting the test results. In an actual situation the roadway is moving relative to the vehicle but the air is stationary relative to the roadway, but in the wind tunnel the air is moving relative to the roadway, while the roadway is stationary relative to the test vehicle. Some automotive-test wind tunnels have incorporated moving belts under the test vehicle in an effort to approximate the actual condition, and very similar devices are used in wind tunnel testing of aircraft take-off and landing configurations.

Wind tunnel testing of sporting equipment has also been prevalent over the years, including golf clubs, golf balls, Olympic bobsleds, Olympic cyclists, and race car helmets.  Helmet aerodynamics is particularly important in open cockpit race cars (Indycar, Formula One).  Excessive lift forces on the helmet can cause considerable neck strain on the driver, and flow separation on the back side of the helmet can cause turbulent buffeting and thus blurred vision for the driver at high speeds.

The advances in computational fluid dynamics (CFD) modelling on high-speed digital computers has reduced the demand for wind tunnel testing.

Measurement of aerodynamic forces
Air velocity and pressures are measured in several ways in wind tunnels.

Air velocity through the test section is determined by Bernoulli's principle.  Measurement of the dynamic pressure, the static pressure, and (for compressible flow only) the temperature rise in the airflow.
The direction of airflow around a model can be determined by tufts of yarn attached to the aerodynamic surfaces. The direction of airflow approaching a surface can be visualized by mounting threads in the airflow ahead of and aft of the test model. Smoke or bubbles of liquid can be introduced into the airflow upstream of the test model, and their path around the model can be photographed (see particle image velocimetry).

Aerodynamic forces on the test model are usually measured with beam balances, connected to the test model with beams, strings, or cables.

The pressure distributions across the test model have historically been measured by drilling many small holes along the airflow path, and using multi-tube manometers to measure the pressure at each hole. Pressure distributions can more conveniently be measured by the use of pressure-sensitive paint, in which higher local pressure is indicated by lowered fluorescence of the paint at that point. Pressure distributions can also be conveniently measured by the use of pressure-sensitive pressure belts, a recent development in which multiple ultra-miniaturized pressure sensor modules are integrated into a flexible strip. The strip is attached to the aerodynamic surface with tape, and it sends signals depicting the pressure distribution along its surface.

Pressure distributions on a test model can also be determined by performing a wake survey, in which either a single pitot tube is used to obtain multiple readings downstream of the test model, or a multiple-tube manometer is mounted downstream and all its readings are taken.

The aerodynamic properties of an object can not all remain the same for a scaled model. However, by observing certain similarity rules, a very satisfactory correspondence between the aerodynamic properties of a scaled model and a full-size object can be achieved. The choice of similarity parameters depends on the purpose of the test, but the most important conditions to satisfy are usually:

 Geometric similarity: all dimensions of the object must be proportionally scaled;
 Mach number: the ratio of the airspeed to the speed of sound should be identical for the scaled model and the actual object (having identical Mach number in a wind tunnel and around the actual object is -not- equal to having identical airspeeds) 
 Reynolds number: the ratio of inertial forces to viscous forces should be kept. This parameter is difficult to satisfy with a scaled model and has led to development of pressurized and cryogenic wind tunnels in which the viscosity of the working fluid can be greatly changed to compensate for the reduced scale of the model.

In certain particular test cases, other similarity parameters must be satisfied, such as e.g. Froude number.

History

Origins

English military engineer and mathematician Benjamin Robins (1707–1751) invented a whirling arm apparatus to determine drag and did some of the first experiments in aviation theory.

Sir George Cayley (1773–1857) also used a whirling arm to measure the drag and lift of various airfoils.

Otto Lilienthal used a rotating arm to accurately measure wing airfoils with varying angles of attack, establishing their lift-to-drag ratio polar diagrams, but was lacking the notions of induced drag and Reynolds numbers.

However, the whirling arm does not produce a reliable flow of air impacting the test shape at a normal incidence. Centrifugal forces and the fact that the object is moving in its own wake mean that detailed examination of the airflow is difficult. Francis Herbert Wenham (1824–1908), a Council Member of the Aeronautical Society of Great Britain, addressed these issues by inventing, designing and operating the first enclosed wind tunnel in 1871. Once this breakthrough had been achieved, detailed technical data was rapidly extracted by the use of this tool. Wenham and his colleague John Browning are credited with many fundamental discoveries, including the measurement of l/d ratios, and the revelation of the beneficial effects of a high aspect ratio.

Konstantin Tsiolkovsky built an open-section wind tunnel with a centrifugal blower in 1897, and determined the drag coefficients of flat plates, cylinders and spheres.

Danish inventor Poul la Cour applied wind tunnels in his process of developing and refining the technology of wind turbines in the early 1890s.
Carl Rickard Nyberg used a wind tunnel when designing his Flugan from 1897 and onwards.

In a classic set of experiments, the Englishman Osborne Reynolds (1842–1912) of the University of Manchester demonstrated that the airflow pattern over a scale model would be the same for the full-scale vehicle if a certain flow parameter were the same in both cases. This factor, now known as the Reynolds number, is a basic parameter in the description of all fluid-flow situations, including the shapes of flow patterns, the ease of heat transfer, and the onset of turbulence. This comprises the central scientific justification for the use of models in wind tunnels to simulate real-life phenomena. However, there are limitations on conditions in which dynamic similarity is based upon the Reynolds number alone.

The Wright brothers' use of a simple wind tunnel in 1901 to study the effects of airflow over various shapes while developing their Wright Flyer was in some ways revolutionary. It can be seen from the above, however, that they were simply using the accepted technology of the day, though this was not yet a common technology in America.

In France, Gustave Eiffel (1832–1923) built his first open-return wind tunnel in 1909, powered by a 50 kW electric motor, at Champs-de-Mars, near the foot of the tower that bears his name.

Between 1909 and 1912 Eiffel ran about 4,000 tests in his wind tunnel, and his systematic experimentation set new standards for aeronautical research.
In 1912 Eiffel's laboratory was moved to Auteuil, a suburb of Paris, where his wind tunnel with a two-metre test section is still operational today. Eiffel significantly improved the efficiency of the open-return wind tunnel by enclosing the test section in a chamber, designing a flared inlet with a honeycomb flow straightener and adding a diffuser between the test section and the fan located at the downstream end of the diffuser; this was an arrangement followed by a number of wind tunnels later built; in fact the open-return low-speed wind tunnel is often called the Eiffel-type wind tunnel.

Widespread usage 

Subsequent use of wind tunnels proliferated as the science of aerodynamics and discipline of aeronautical engineering were established and air travel and power were developed.

The US Navy in 1916 built one of the largest wind tunnels in the world at that time at the Washington Navy Yard. A 500 hp electric motor drove the paddle type fan blades.

In 1931 the NACA built a 30-foot-by-60-foot full-scale wind tunnel at Langley Research Center in Langley, Virginia. The tunnel was powered by a pair of fans driven by 4,000 hp electric motors. The layout was a double-return, closed-loop format and could accommodate many full-size real aircraft as well as scale models. The tunnel was eventually closed and, even though it was declared a National Historic Landmark in 1995, demolition began in 2010.

Until World War II, the world's largest wind tunnel, built in 1932–1934, was located in a suburb of Paris, Chalais-Meudon, France.  It was designed to test full-size aircraft and had six large fans driven by high powered electric motors. The Chalais-Meudon wind tunnel was used by ONERA under the name S1Ch until 1976 in the development of, e.g., the Caravelle and Concorde airplanes. Today, this wind tunnel is preserved as a national monument.

Ludwig Prandtl was Theodore von Kármán's teacher at Göttingen University and suggested the construction of a wind tunnel for tests of airships they were designing. The vortex street of turbulence downstream of a cylinder was tested in the tunnel. When he later moved to Aachen University he recalled use of this facility:

I remembered the wind tunnel in Göttingen was started as a tool for studies of Zeppelin behavior, but that it had proven to be valuable for everything else from determining the direction of smoke from a ship's stack, to whether a given airplane would fly. Progress at Aachen, I felt, would be virtually impossible without a good wind tunnel.

When von Kármán began to consult with Caltech he worked with Clark Millikan and Arthur L. Klein. He objected to their design and insisted on a return flow making the device "independent of the fluctuations of the outside atmosphere". It was completed in 1930 and used for Northrop Alpha testing.

In 1939 General Arnold asked what was required to advance the USAF, and von Kármán answered, "The first step is to build the right wind tunnel." On the other hand, after the successes of the Bell X-2 and prospect of more advanced research, he wrote, "I was in favor of constructing such a plane because I have never believed that you can get all the answers out of a wind tunnel."

World War II
In 1941 the US constructed one of the largest wind tunnels at that time at Wright Field in Dayton, Ohio. Two  fans were driven by a 40,000 hp electric motor.

The wind tunnel used by German scientists at Peenemünde prior to and during WWII is an interesting example of the difficulties associated with extending the useful range of large wind tunnels. It used some large natural caves which were increased in size by excavation and then sealed to store large volumes of air which could then be routed through the wind tunnels. This innovative approach allowed lab research in high-speed regimes and greatly accelerated the rate of advance of Germany's aeronautical engineering efforts. By the end of the war, Germany had at least three different supersonic wind tunnels, with one capable of Mach 4.4 (heated) airflows.

A large wind tunnel under construction near Oetztal, Austria would have had two fans directly driven by two 50,000 horsepower hydraulic turbines. The installation was not completed by the end of the war and the dismantled equipment was shipped to Modane, France in 1946 where it was re-erected and is still operated there by the ONERA. With its 8m test section and airspeed up to Mach 1 it is the largest transonic wind tunnel facility in the world.

On 22 June 1942, Curtiss-Wright financed construction of one of the nation's largest subsonic wind tunnels in Buffalo, N.Y. The first concrete for building was poured on 22 June 1942 on a site that eventually would become Calspan, where the largest independently owned wind tunnel in the United States still operates.

By the end of World War II, the US had built eight new wind tunnels, including the largest one in the world at Moffett Field near Sunnyvale, California, which was designed to test full size aircraft at speeds of less than 250 mph and a vertical wind tunnel at Wright Field, Ohio, where the wind stream is upwards for the testing of models in spin situations and the concepts and engineering designs for the first primitive helicopters flown in the US.

After World War II

Later research into airflows near or above the speed of sound used a related approach. Metal pressure chambers were used to store high-pressure air which was then accelerated through a nozzle designed to provide supersonic flow. The observation or instrumentation chamber ("test section") was then placed at the proper location in the throat or nozzle for the desired airspeed.

In the United States, concern over the lagging of American research facilities compared to those built by the Germans led to the Unitary Wind Tunnel Plan Act of 1949, which authorized expenditure to construct new wind tunnels at universities and at military sites. Some German war-time wind tunnels were dismantled for shipment to the United States as part of the plan to exploit German technology developments.

For limited applications, Computational fluid dynamics (CFD) can supplement or possibly replace the use of wind tunnels. For example, the experimental rocket plane SpaceShipOne was designed without any use of wind tunnels. However, on one test, flight threads were attached to the surface of the wings, performing a wind tunnel type of test during an actual flight in order to refine the computational model. Where external turbulent flow is present, CFD is not practical due to limitations in present-day computing resources. For example, an area that is still much too complex for the use of CFD is determining the effects of flow on and around structures, bridges, terrain, etc.

The most effective way to simulative external turbulent flow is through the use of a boundary layer wind tunnel.

There are many applications for boundary layer wind tunnel modeling. For example, understanding the impact of wind on high-rise buildings, factories, bridges, etc. can help building designers construct a structure that stands up to wind effects in the most efficient manner possible. Another significant application for boundary layer wind tunnel modeling is for understanding exhaust gas dispersion patterns for hospitals, laboratories, and other emitting sources. Other examples of boundary layer wind tunnel applications are assessments of pedestrian comfort and snow drifting. Wind tunnel modeling is accepted as a method for aiding in Green building design. For instance, the use of boundary layer wind tunnel modeling can be used as a credit for Leadership in Energy and Environmental Design (LEED) certification through the U.S. Green Building Council.

Wind tunnel tests in a boundary layer wind tunnel allow for the natural drag of the Earth's surface to be simulated. For accuracy, it is important to simulate the mean wind speed profile and turbulence effects within the atmospheric boundary layer. Most codes and standards recognize that wind tunnel testing can produce reliable information for designers, especially when their projects are in complex terrain or on exposed sites.

In the United States, many wind tunnels have been decommissioned from 1990 to 2010, including some historic facilities. Pressure is brought to bear on remaining wind tunnels due to declining or erratic usage, high electricity costs, and in some cases the high value of the real estate upon which the facility sits. On the other hand, CFD validation still requires wind-tunnel data, and this is likely to be the case for the foreseeable future. Studies have been done and others are underway to assess future military and commercial wind tunnel needs, but the outcome remains uncertain. More recently an increasing use of jet-powered, instrumented unmanned vehicles ["research drones"] have replaced some of the traditional uses of wind tunnels. The world's fastest wind tunnel as of 2019 is the LENS-X wind tunnel, located in Buffalo, New York.

How it works

Air is blown or sucked through a duct equipped with a viewing port and instrumentation where models or geometrical shapes are mounted for study. Typically the air is moved through the tunnel using a series of fans. For very large wind tunnels several meters in diameter, a single large fan is not practical, and so instead an array of multiple fans are used in parallel to provide sufficient airflow. Due to the sheer volume and speed of air movement required, the fans may be powered by stationary turbofan engines rather than electric motors.

The airflow created by the fans that is entering the tunnel is itself highly turbulent due to the fan blade motion (when the fan is blowing air into the test section – when it is sucking air out of the test section downstream, the fan-blade turbulence is not a factor), and so is not directly useful for accurate measurements. The air moving through the tunnel needs to be relatively turbulence-free and laminar. To correct this problem, closely spaced vertical and horizontal air vanes are used to smooth out the turbulent airflow before reaching the subject of the testing.

Due to the effects of viscosity, the cross-section of a wind tunnel is typically circular rather than square, because there will be greater flow constriction in the corners of a square tunnel that can make the flow turbulent. A circular tunnel provides a smoother flow.

The inside facing of the tunnel is typically as smooth as possible, to reduce surface drag and turbulence that could impact the accuracy of the testing. Even smooth walls induce some drag into the airflow, and so the object being tested is usually kept near the center of the tunnel, with an empty buffer zone between the object and the tunnel walls. There are correction factors to relate wind tunnel test results to open-air results.

The lighting is usually embedded into the circular walls of the tunnel and shines in through windows. If the light were mounted on the inside surface of the tunnel in a conventional manner, the light bulb would generate turbulence as the air blows around it. Similarly, observation is usually done through transparent portholes into the tunnel. Rather than simply being flat discs, these lighting and observation windows may be curved to match the cross-section of the tunnel and further reduce turbulence around the window.

Various techniques are used to study the actual airflow around the geometry and compare it with theoretical results, which must also take into account the Reynolds number and Mach number for the regime of operation.

Pressure measurements
Pressure across the surfaces of the model can be measured if the model includes pressure taps. This can be useful for pressure-dominated phenomena, but this only accounts for normal forces on the body.

Force and moment measurements

With the model mounted on a force balance, one can measure lift, drag, lateral forces, yaw, roll, and pitching moments over a range of angle of attack. This allows one to produce common curves such as lift coefficient versus angle of attack (shown).

Note that the force balance itself creates drag and potential turbulence that will affect the model and introduce errors into the measurements. The supporting structures are therefore typically smoothly shaped to minimize turbulence.

Flow visualization
Because air is transparent it is difficult to directly observe the air movement itself. Instead, multiple methods of both quantitative and qualitative flow visualization methods have been developed for testing in a wind tunnel.

Qualitative methods
 Smoke
 Carbon Dioxide Injection
 Tufts, mini-tufts, or flow cones can be applied to a model and remain attached during testing. Tufts can be used to gauge air flow patterns and flow separation.  Tufts are sometimes made of fluorescent material and are illuminated under black light to aid in visualization.
Evaporating suspensions are simply a mixture of some sort or fine powder, talc, or clay mixed into a liquid with a low latent heat of evaporation. When the wind is turned on the liquid quickly evaporates, leaving behind the clay in a pattern characteristic of the air flow.
 Oil: When oil is applied to the model surface it can clearly show the transition from laminar to turbulent flow as well as flow separation.
 Tempera Paint: Similar to oil, tempera paint can be applied to the surface of the model by initially applying the paint in spaced out dots.  After running the wind tunnel, the flow direction and separation can be identified.  An additional strategy in the use of tempera paint is to use blacklights to create a luminous flow pattern with the tempera paint.
 Fog (usually from water particles) is created with an ultrasonic piezoelectric nebulizer. The fog is transported inside the wind tunnel (preferably of the closed circuit and closed test section type). An electrically heated grid is inserted before the test section, which evaporates the water particles at its vicinity, thus forming fog sheets. The fog sheets function as streamlines over the test model when illuminated by a light sheet.
 Sublimation: If the air movement in the tunnel is sufficiently non-turbulent, a particle stream released into the airflow will not break up as the air moves along, but stay together as a sharp thin line. Multiple particle streams released from a grid of many nozzles can provide a dynamic three-dimensional shape of the airflow around a body. As with the force balance, these injection pipes and nozzles need to be shaped in a manner that minimizes the introduction of turbulent airflow into the airstream.
 Sublimation (alternate definition): A flow visualization technique is to coat the model in a sublimatable material where once the wind is turned on in regions where the airflow is laminar, the material will remain attached to the model, while conversely in turbulent areas the material will evaporate off of the model.  This technique is primarily employed to verify that trip dots placed at the leading edge in order to force a transition are successfully achieving the intended goal.

High-speed turbulence and vortices can be difficult to see directly, but strobe lights and film cameras or high-speed digital cameras can help to capture events that are a blur to the naked eye.

High-speed cameras are also required when the subject of the test is itself moving at high speed, such as an airplane propeller. The camera can capture stop-motion images of how the blade cuts through the particulate streams and how vortices are generated along the trailing edges of the moving blade.

Quantitative methods

 Pressure Sensitive Paint (PSP): PSP is a technique whereby a model is spray coated with a paint that reacts to variations in pressure by changing color.  In conjunction with this technique, cameras are usually positioned at strategic viewing angles through the walls, ceiling, and floor of the wind tunnel to photograph the model while the wind is on.  The photographic results can be digitized to create a full distribution of the external pressures acting on the model, and subsequently mapped onto a computational geometric mesh for direct comparison with CFD results.  PSP measurements can be effective at capturing pressure variations across the model however often require supplemental pressure taps on the surface of the model to verify the absolute magnitude of the pressure coefficients.  An important property of well behaved PSP paints is they also should be insensitive to temperature effects since the temperature inside the wind tunnel could vary considerably after continuously running.  Common difficulties encountered when using PSP include the inability to accurately measure the leading and trailing edge effects in areas where there is high curvature due to limitations in the cameras ability to gain an advantageous viewing angle.  Additionally application of PSP on the leading edge is sometimes avoided because it introduces a finite thickness that could cause early flow separation thus corrupting results.  Since the pressure variations at the leading edge is typically of primary interest, the lack of accurate results in that region is very problematic.  Once a model is painted with pressure sensitive paint, certain paints have been known to adhere and continue to perform for a matter of months after initially applied.  Finally PSP paints have been known to have certain frequency characteristics where some require a few moments to stabilize before achieving accurate results while others converge rapidly.  In the latter instance paints that have ability to reflect rapid changes in pressure can be used for Dynamic PSP applications where the intent is to measure unsteady flow characteristics.
 Particle Image Velocimetry (PIV): PIV is a technique in which a laser sheet is emitted through a slit in the wall of the tunnel where an imaging device is able to track the local velocity direction of particles in the plane of the laser sheet.  Sometimes this technique involves seeding the airflow with observable material.  This technique allows for the quantitative measurement of the velocity and direction of the flow across the areas captured in the plane of the laser.
 Model Deformation Measurement (MDM): MDM works by placing markers at known geometric locations on the wind tunnel model and taking photographs of the change in the marker's location as the wind in the tunnel is applied.  By analyzing the change in marker positions from different camera viewing angles, the translational change in location of the marker can be calculated.  By collecting results from a few markers, the degree to which the model is flexibly yielding due to the air load can be calculated.

Classification
There are many different kinds of wind tunnels.  They are typically classified by the range of speeds that are achieved in the test section, as follows:

 Low-speed wind tunnel
 High speed wind tunnel
 Subsonic and transonic wind tunnel
 Supersonic wind tunnel
 Hypersonic wind tunnel
 High enthalpy wind tunnel

Wind tunnels are also classified by the orientation of air flow in the test section with respect to gravity.  Typically they are oriented horizontally, as happens during level flight.  A different class of wind tunnels are oriented vertically so that gravity can be balanced by drag instead of lift, and these have become a popular form of recreation for simulating sky-diving:

 Vertical wind tunnel

Wind tunnels are also classified based on their main use. For those used with land vehicles such as cars and trucks the type of floor aerodynamics is also important. These vary from stationary floors through to full moving floors, with smaller moving floors and some attempt at boundary level control also being important.

Aeronautical wind tunnels
The main subcategories in the aeronautical wind tunnels are:

High Reynolds number tunnels
Reynolds number is one of the governing similarity parameters for the simulation of flow in a wind tunnel. For mach number less than 0.3, it is the primary parameter that governs the flow characteristics. There are three main ways to simulate high Reynolds number, since it is not practical to obtain full scale Reynolds number by use of a full scale vehicle.
 Pressurised tunnels: Here test gases are pressurised to increase the Reynolds number.
 Heavy gas tunnels: Heavier gases like freon and R-134a are used as test gases. The transonic dynamics tunnel at NASA Langley is an example of such a tunnel.
 Cryogenic tunnels: Here test gas is cooled down to increase the Reynolds number. The European transonic wind tunnel uses this technique.
 High-altitude tunnels: These are designed to test the effects of shock waves against various aircraft shapes in near vacuum.  In 1952 the University of California constructed the first two high-altitude wind tunnels: one for testing objects at 50 to 70 miles above the earth and the second for tests at 80 to 200 miles above the earth.

V/STOL tunnels
V/STOL tunnels require large cross section area, but only small velocities. Since power varies with the cube of velocity, the power required for the operation is also less. An example of a V/STOL tunnel is the NASA Langley 14' x 22' tunnel.

Spin tunnels
Aircraft have a tendency to go to spin when they stall. These tunnels are used to study that phenomenon.

Automotive tunnels
Automotive wind tunnels fall into two categories:
 External flow tunnels are used to study the external flow through the chassis
 Climatic tunnels are used to evaluate the performance of door systems, braking systems, etc. under various climatic conditions. Most of the leading automobile manufacturers have their own climatic wind tunnels

Wunibald Kamm built the first full-scale wind tunnel for motor vehicles.

For external flow tunnels various systems are used to compensate for  the effect of the boundary layer on the road surface, including systems of moving belts under each wheel and the body of the car (5 or 7 belt systems) or one large belt under the entire car, or other methods of boundary layer control such as scoops or perforations to suck it away.

Aeroacoustic tunnels
These tunnels are used in the studies of noise generated by flow and its suppression.

High enthalpy
A high enthalpy wind tunnel is intended to study flow of air around objects moving at speeds much faster than the local speed of sound (hypersonic speeds). "Enthalpy" is the total energy of a gas stream, composed of internal energy due to temperature, the product of pressure and volume, and the velocity of flow. Duplication of the conditions of hypersonic flight requires large volumes of high-pressure, heated air; large pressurized hot reservoirs, and electric arcs, are two techniques used.

Aquadynamic flume
The aerodynamic principles of the wind tunnel work equally on watercraft, except the water is more viscous and so sets greater forces on the object being tested. A looping flume is typically used for underwater aquadynamic testing. The interaction between two different types of fluids means that pure wind tunnel testing is only partly relevant. However, a similar sort of research is done in a towing tank.

Low-speed oversize liquid testing
Air is not always the best test medium for studying small-scale aerodynamic principles, due to the speed of the air flow and airfoil movement. A study of fruit fly wings designed to understand how the wings produce lift was performed using a large tank of mineral oil and wings 100 times larger than actual size, in order to slow down the wing beats and make the vortices generated by the insect wings easier to see and understand.

Fan testing

Wind tunnel tests are also performed to precisely measure the air movement of fans at a specific pressure. By determining the environmental circumstances during measurement, and by revising the air-tightness afterwards, the standardization of the data is ensured.

There are two possible ways of measurement: a complete fan, or an impeller on a hydraulic installation. Two measuring tubes enable measurements of lower air currents (< 30,000 m3/h) as well as higher air currents (< 60,000 m3/h). The determination of the Q/h curve of the fan is one of the main objectives. To determine this curve (and to define other parameters) air technical, mechanical as well as electro technical data are measured:

Air technical:
 Static pressure difference (Pa)
 Amount of moved air (m3/h)
 Average air speed (m/s)
 Specific efficiency (W/1000 m3/h)
 Efficiency

Electro technical:
 Tension (V)
 Current (A)
 Cos φ
 Admitted power (W) fan / impeller
 Rotations per minute (RPM)

The measurement can take place on the fan or in the application in which the fan is used.

Wind engineering testing
In wind engineering, wind tunnel tests are used to measure the velocity around, and forces or pressures upon structures. Very tall buildings, buildings with unusual or complicated shapes (such as a tall building with a parabolic or a hyperbolic shape), cable suspension bridges or cable stayed bridges are analyzed in specialized atmospheric boundary layer wind tunnels. These feature a long upwind section to accurately represent the wind speed and turbulence profile acting on the structure. Wind tunnel tests provide the necessary design pressure measurements in use of the dynamic analysis and control of tall buildings.

See also
 Arsenal (Vienna), climatic wind tunnel centre used by the rail industry
 Automobile design
 Doriot Climatic Chambers, climatic wind tunnel centre operated by the United States military
 Frank Wattendorf
 Sting (fixture)
 Water tunnel, the hydrodynamics-oriented version of a wind tunnel
 List of wind tunnels

References

Further reading
Jewel B. Barlow, William H. Rae, Jr., Allan Pope: Low speed wind tunnels testing (3rd ed.)

External links

 

Aerodynamics
 
Articles containing video clips
19th-century introductions